In graph theory, a factor of a graph G is a spanning subgraph, i.e., a subgraph that has the same vertex set as G. A k-factor of a graph is a spanning k-regular subgraph, and a k-factorization partitions the edges of the graph into disjoint k-factors. A graph G is said to be k-factorable if it admits a k-factorization. In particular, a 1-factor is a perfect matching, and a 1-factorization of a k-regular graph is an edge coloring with k colors. A 2-factor is a collection of cycles that spans all vertices of the graph.

1-factorization

If a graph is 1-factorable (i.e., has a 1-factorization), then it has to be a regular graph. However, not all regular graphs are 1-factorable. A k-regular graph is 1-factorable if it has chromatic index k; examples of such graphs include:
 Any regular bipartite graph. Hall's marriage theorem can be used to show that a k-regular bipartite graph contains a perfect matching. One can then remove the perfect matching to obtain a (k − 1)-regular bipartite graph, and apply the same reasoning repeatedly.
 Any complete graph with an even number of nodes (see below).
However, there are also k-regular graphs that have chromatic index k + 1, and these graphs are not 1-factorable; examples of such graphs include:
 Any regular graph with an odd number of nodes.
 The Petersen graph.

Complete graphs

A 1-factorization of a complete graph corresponds to pairings in a round-robin tournament. The 1-factorization of complete graphs is a special case of Baranyai's theorem concerning the 1-factorization of complete hypergraphs.

One method for constructing a 1-factorization of a complete graph on an even number of vertices involves placing all but one of the vertices on a circle, forming a regular polygon, with the remaining vertex at the center of the circle. With this arrangement of vertices, one way of constructing a 1-factor of the graph is to choose an edge e from the center to a single polygon vertex together with all possible edges that lie on lines perpendicular to e. The 1-factors that can be constructed in this way form a 1-factorization of the graph.

The number of distinct 1-factorizations of K2, K4, K6, K8, ... is 1, 1, 6, 6240, 1225566720, 252282619805368320, 98758655816833727741338583040, ... .

1-factorization conjecture
Let G be a k-regular graph with 2n nodes. If k is sufficiently large, it is known that G has to be 1-factorable:
 If k = 2n − 1, then G is the complete graph K2n, and hence 1-factorable (see above).
 If k = 2n − 2, then G can be constructed by removing a perfect matching from K2n. Again, G is 1-factorable.
  show that if k ≥ 12n/7, then G is 1-factorable.
The 1-factorization conjecture is a long-standing conjecture that states that k ≈ n is sufficient. In precise terms, the conjecture is:
 If n is odd and k ≥ n, then G is 1-factorable. If n is even and k ≥ n − 1 then G is 1-factorable.
The overfull conjecture implies the 1-factorization conjecture.

Perfect 1-factorization
A perfect pair from a 1-factorization is a pair of 1-factors whose union induces a Hamiltonian cycle.

A perfect 1-factorization (P1F) of a graph is a 1-factorization having the property that every pair of 1-factors is a perfect pair. A perfect 1-factorization should not be confused with a perfect matching (also called a 1-factor).

In 1964, Anton Kotzig conjectured that every complete graph K2n where n ≥ 2 has a perfect 1-factorization. So far, it is known that the following graphs have a perfect 1-factorization:

 the infinite family of complete graphs K2p where p is an odd prime (by Anderson and also Nakamura, independently),
 the infinite family of complete graphs Kp + 1 where p is an odd prime,
 and sporadic additional results, including K2n where 2n ∈ {16, 28, 36, 40, 50, 126, 170, 244, 344, 730, 1332, 1370, 1850, 2198, 3126, 6860, 12168, 16808, 29792}. Some newer results are collected here.

If the complete graph Kn + 1 has a perfect 1-factorization, then the complete bipartite graph Kn,n also has a perfect 1-factorization.

2-factorization

If a graph is 2-factorable, then it has to be 2k-regular for some integer k. Julius Petersen showed in 1891 that this necessary condition is also sufficient: any 2k-regular graph is 2-factorable.

If a connected graph is 2k-regular and has an even number of edges it may also be k-factored, by choosing each of the two factors to be an alternating subset of the edges of an Euler tour.  This applies only to connected graphs; disconnected counterexamples include disjoint unions of odd cycles, or of copies of K2k+1.

The Oberwolfach problem concerns the existence of 2-factorizations of complete graphs into isomorphic subgraphs. It asks for which subgraphs this is possible. This is known when the subgraph is connected (in which case it is a Hamiltonian cycle and this special case is the problem of Hamiltonian decomposition) but the general case remains unsolved.

References

Bibliography

, Section 5.1: "Matchings".
.
, Chapter 2: "Matching, covering and packing". Electronic edition.
, Chapter 9: "Factorization".
 
.
.
.

Further reading

.

Graph theory objects
Factorization